Flávio Saretta Filho (born June 28, 1980) is a former professional tennis player from Brazil who turned professional in 1998.

Tennis career
Saretta has won one ATP Tour doubles title, the 2004 Croatia Open Umag with José Acasuso, defeating Czech players Jaroslav Levinský and David Škoch in the final.

In 2004 he competed in the Tennis Olympic Tournament in both the singles and doubles tournaments. He was eliminated by Andy Roddick in the singles tournament round of 64 and, playing together with André Sá, he reached the doubles tournament round of 16, where he was eliminated by Wayne Black and Kevin Ullyett, from Zimbabwe.

He reached his highest singles ATP-ranking on September 15, 2003, when he became the number 44 of the world, capping what would be the best season of his professional career. He had his best results in all 4 of the Grand Slam tournaments, reaching the Round of 16 at Roland Garros. His clay court prowess was also evident when he was successful in defending his crown at the Bermuda Challenger tournament in April.

During the Hamburg Masters in 2006, Saretta scored one of his biggest wins against the Russian former World No. 1 Marat Safin, 5–7, 6–0, 6–4.

Flávio Saretta won the Rio Pan-American Games 2007, after saving 2 match-points at semi and at final against, respectively, Eduardo Schwank and Adrián García. In the end of 2007 Saretta had one of the biggest injuries of his entire career and he is out of the circuit since then.

In 2009, Saretta announced that he will stop playing professionally because he is tired of "fighting against the pain" of his injuries. He had an unsuccessful comeback in 2014, losing all his matches that year in three tournaments played in Brazilian soil.

In 2015 Saretta became a tennis commentator for BandSports, a Brazilian sports cable channel.

Titles (12)

Singles (7)

Doubles (5)

Runners-up (14)

Singles (6)

Doubles (8)

External links
 
 
 

Living people
1980 births
People from Americana, São Paulo
Brazilian people of Italian descent
Brazilian male tennis players
Olympic tennis players of Brazil
Tennis players at the 2004 Summer Olympics
Tennis players at the 2007 Pan American Games
Pan American Games gold medalists for Brazil
Pan American Games medalists in tennis
Medalists at the 2007 Pan American Games
Sportspeople from São Paulo (state)